Ratna Manikya II ( – 1712) was the Maharaja of Tripura from 1685 to 1693 and again from 1695 to 1712.

Only a small child when he became ruler, Ratna spent much of his life under the control of external forces, having been used as a puppet-monarch by domineering relations as well as being both deposed and enthroned by the powerful Mughal Empire. He was eventually killed in a coup orchestrated by his younger brother.

Background and first reign
Born Ratnadeva, he was the eldest of Maharaja Rama Manikya's four surviving sons and the only one to be born of his chief queen. During his father's reign, he held the post of Yuvraj.

Rama died in 1685 and Ratna, then only 5 years old, ascended the throne under the name Ratna Manikya. The state of confusion which had ensued upon his father's death continued throughout the early years of Ratna's reign. Due to his young age, control of the state was held by his maternal uncle, Balibhima Narayana, who is described in the Champakvijay (a contemporary political work) as having been an oppressive ruler. Narayana eventually fell afoul of the Subahdar of Bengal, Shaista Khan, who, in reprisal for an invasion of the Mughal territory of Sylhet, launched an assault on Tripura in 1693. Narayana was imprisoned and the young Ratna was overthrown and replaced with his cousin, Narendra Manikya, who had aided Khan in the campaign.

Second reign
Narendra reigned for about two years, during which time Ratna was kept by his side and treated affectionately. The former was eventually deposed by Shaista Khan, who had been influenced against him by another cousin, Champak Ray, among others. Ratna was subsequently restored to the throne, though once again had little actual power, having become a puppet-ruler under Ray, who was named his Yuvraj. The latter was eventually assassinated by the king's supporters.

Finally secure as ruler in his own right, Ratna enacted a number of administrative changes, such as restoring earlier ministerial positions as well as creating new ones. One of his brothers, Durjoy Singh, was named the new Yuvraj while another, Ghanashyam, was made Barathakur. Ratna also had dealings with other kingdoms, having battled King Paikhomba of Manipur in 1696, as well as sending another brother, Chandramani, as a hostage to the Mughal court. Between 1710 and 1715, a series of embassies and letters in Sanskrit were exchanged between the court of Tripura and that of the ruler of the Ahom kingdom, Rudra Singha, with the purpose of developing a Hindu confederation against Mughal attacks.

Due to the internal instability during his reign, Ratna had little opportunity to contribute to public works within his kingdom. Among the few he did commission was the Sateroratna Mandir, a temple dedicated to the god Jagannath in Comilla, located in what is present-day Bangladesh. Images of the goddess Kali were also installed in Comilla as well as at the temple at Kasba.

Overthrow and death
Towards the end of his reign, a conspiracy was launched against Ratna by his brother Ghanashyam. The latter was assisted by Murad Beg, an influential noble at court whose married sister had been dishonoured by the king. Murad was dispatched to Dhaka, where he recruited some itinerant forces as well as a high-ranking local officer against Ratna. Ghanashyam himself was frequently absent from the capital, using the excuse that he was holding wild elephants. According to the Rajmala, Ratna was informed by his supporters that his brother was plotting against him, though he ignored the information. Historian Ramani Mohan Sarma suggests that this inaction may either have been due to the king's inexperience with diplomacy resulting in a misplaced trust in Ghanashyam, or that he was fearful of moving against his powerful brother.

In 1712, Ratna was forcibly removed from the throne and confined to the royal apartments. Ghanashyam, who took power under the name Mahendra Manikya, later had him strangled to death, with his body being cremated on the banks of the Gomti River. Ratna's wives, said to have numbered 120, all immolated themselves on his funeral pyre.

Notes

References

Bibliography

 

Kings of Tripura
History of Tripura
Child monarchs from Asia
Dethroned monarchs
Monarchs deposed as children
1712 deaths
Murdered Indian monarchs
18th-century murdered monarchs
1712 murders in Asia
18th-century murders in India